Jean-Philippe Pearson (born 1970) is a Canadian actor and screenwriter. He is most noted as cowriter with Patrice Robitaille and Ricardo Trogi of the film Québec-Montréal (2002), for which they won the Jutra Award for Best Screenplay at the 5th Jutra Awards in 2003.

He was also a Genie Award nominee for Best Original Screenplay at the 23rd Genie Awards for Québec-Montréal, and Jutra Award winner for Best screenplay for Québec-Montréal and Oliver Award winner for best comedy 2005 Dodging the Clock.

Filmography

References

External links

1970 births
Living people
20th-century Canadian male actors
21st-century Canadian male actors
21st-century Canadian male writers
21st-century Canadian screenwriters
Canadian male film actors
Canadian male screenwriters
Canadian screenwriters in French
French Quebecers
Male actors from Ottawa
Writers from Ottawa